Dichrorampha acuminatana is a moth of the family Tortricidae. It is found in Europe and the Near East.

The wingspan is 10–15 mm.The costa  of the forewings is straighter than in [related species].The fold reaches 1/3 . The ground colour is dark fuscous, purplish-tinged, more or less obscurely irrorated with ochreous. The costa has obscure leaden-metallic posterior streaks The basal area is paler- streaked and there is a paler broad triangular straight-edged median dorsal blotch and three black dots on the termen towards middle, sometimes nearly obsolete . The termen is straight, sinuation very slight and the  white line of the cilia is sharply marked. The hindwings are light fuscous, darker in female .The larva is whitish ; head light brown ; plate of
2 faintly brownish.

The moth flies from May to September..

The larvae feed on Leucanthemum vulgare and tansy.

Notes
The flight season refers to Belgium and the Netherlands. This may vary in other parts of the range.

References

External links
 waarneming.nl 
 Lepidoptera of Belgium
 Dichrorampha acuminatana at UKmoths

Tortricidae of Europe
Insects of Turkey